Grand Bay is the name of more than one place:

Communities
Grand Bay, Alabama, United States
Grand Bay, Dominica (officially known as Berekua)
Grand Bay, Grenada, a village in Carriacou island
Grand Bay, Mauritius
Grand Bay–Westfield, New Brunswick, Canada
Grand Bay (Newfoundland and Labrador), Canada

Water bodies
Grand Bay (Georgia), a swamp in the United States
Grand Bay (New Brunswick), Canada
Political constituencies

 Grand Bay (Dominica constituency), electoral district in Dominica

See also
 Grand Baie, Mauritius
 Grand-Baie, les Saintes, Guadelope
 Grande-Baie, Quebec, Canada